Luke Burgess (born 20 August 1984) is a retired professional rugby union player. His usual position was scrum-half. He represented Australia on 37 occasions.

Early career
Burgess was born in Newcastle, Australia.  He played his club rugby with Sydney University Colts and Eastern Suburbs RUFC in Sydney.

Professional career
He played with the Brumbies from 2003 to 2007, but due to the presence of Wallaby captain George Gregan, he only made two appearances for the team, making his Super 12 debut in 2005. In 2007 he played for the Melbourne Rebels in the now defunct Australian Rugby Championship.

Burgess joined the NSW Waratahs in 2008, and made his first Super 14 appearance off the bench mid-year. Later that year he made his Test debut for the Wallabies against Ireland at the Telstra Dome, Melbourne. A knee injury kept him out of the 2008 Tri Nations Series, but he was selected for the Wallabies end 2008 Spring Tour.

From 2011, Burgess played for Stade Toulousain in the Top 14 championship, France, making his debut in the Heineken Cup match against Gloucester.

He joined the Melbourne Rebels for the start of the 2014 Super Rugby season.

In 2015, he moved to Italy to play for Zebre and announced his retirement from professional rugby in May 2016.

References

External links
 Melbourne Rebels Profile

 "Luke Burgess" on ESPN

1983 births
Living people
Australian rugby union players
Australia international rugby union players
Stade Toulousain players
ACT Brumbies players
New South Wales Waratahs players
Melbourne Rebels players
Melbourne Rising players
Rugby union scrum-halves
Rugby league players from Newcastle, New South Wales
Expatriate rugby union players in France
Australian expatriate sportspeople in France
Expatriate rugby union players in Italy
Australian expatriate sportspeople in Italy
Zebre Parma players
Rugby union players from Newcastle, New South Wales